Leiorreuma is a genus of script lichens in the family Graphidaceae. It has 18 species. The genus was circumscribed by Franz Gerhard Eschweiler in 1824, with Leiorreuma hepaticum assigned as the type species.

Description
Leiorreuma is identified by certain features. It has apothecia with noticeable  opened . The  is often thin on the sides but well-developed at the base and appears . The hymenium is dotted with small specks, and the spores are pale brown and have thin walls with crosswise septa or are divided into many compartments. They are not stained by iodine.

Species

 Leiorreuma convariatum 
 Leiorreuma crassimarginatum  – China
 Leiorreuma dilatatum 
 Leiorreuma ellipticum 
 Leiorreuma erodens  – Florida
 Leiorreuma exaltatum 
 Leiorreuma explicans 
 Leiorreuma hepaticum 
 Leiorreuma hypomelaenoides  – Thailand
 Leiorreuma hypomelaenum 
 Leiorreuma melanostalazans 
 Leiorreuma nicobarense  – India
 Leiorreuma nornotaticum 
 Leiorreuma patellulum 
 Leiorreuma sericeum 
 Leiorreuma subpatellulum  – India
 Leiorreuma taiwanense  – Taiwan
 Leiorreuma vaginans 
 Leiorreuma vicarians 
 Leiorreuma yakushimense  – Japan

References

Graphidaceae
Lichen genera
Ostropales genera
Taxa described in 1824
Taxa named by Franz Gerhard Eschweiler